Harry Lester Adams (October 1, 1880 – August 12, 1968) was an American sport shooter who competed in the 1912 Summer Olympics and in the 1920 Summer Olympics. In 1912 he won the gold medal as member of the American team in the team military rifle competition.  In the 1912 Summer Olympics he also participated in the following events:

 600 metre free rifle - twelfth place
 300 metre military rifle, three positions - twelfth place
 300 metre free rifle, three positions - 28th place

Eight years later he participated in the 300 metre military rifle, prone event but his place is unknown. He was born in Medway, Massachusetts.

References

External links
Harry Adams' profile at databaseOlympics

1880 births
1968 deaths
American male sport shooters
United States Distinguished Marksman
ISSF rifle shooters
Shooters at the 1912 Summer Olympics
Shooters at the 1920 Summer Olympics
Olympic gold medalists for the United States in shooting
Olympic medalists in shooting
Medalists at the 1912 Summer Olympics
20th-century American people